CUSCO is a Japanese automotive parts company, specializing in car suspension parts. They are most famous for their coilover suspensions, and are a large presence in the Japanese automotive aftermarket in the domestic Japanese market and around the globe.

A notable product of CUSCO is the "E-CON", a coilover suspension set with electronically controlled dampers.

Cusco sponsored a high performance, RWD mid-engined two-door version of the Subaru WRX STI for professional racing.

Company Information 
CUSCO Japan is an automotive company that was started in December 1977. As stated above it is a company specializing in car parts specifically suspension and coilover kits. Its company name is actually Carrosser Co. Ltd with Cusco being one of four brands. The four brands are as follows: Cusco, Vacanza, Carrosser, and Safety21. The President of Operations is Tsutomu Nagase and they are a considerably small company, with only 45 active members as of 2011. They have a capital of 10 Million Yen (roughly 100,000 USD).

Foreign Expansion and Auto History 
Cusco have had a history of providing parts for Rallycross races, and even having a Rallycross car represent them in a race. An example would be when they sponsored Subaru. Carrosser is actually the only brand in Japan that has participated in all of the events at the All Japanese Championships.

Brands 
The company is divided into 4 separate brands each having a purpose to the company. These brands are Cusco, Vacanza, Carrosser, and Safety21. Each brand plays a part in manufacturing and selling parts for a type of car. Some parts are tested on the track in racing events, and all products are tested in the laboratory.

Cusco 
Cusco is the main brand, responsible for selling generic and racing gears.

Vacanza 
Vacanza manufactures coilover kits and parts for minivans, SUVs (Sports Utility Vehicles), and station wagons. Designed by Carrosser.

Carrosser 
The design philosophy of both Cusco and Vacanza lie in the Carrosser brand. Given authority from the JAF (Japanese Automotive Federation) Carrosser is the competition brand of the company. They participate in all the races of the All Japan Championship, and have gotten sponsorship from Japanese automaker Subaru

Safety21 
This brand is specifically put into place to manufacture the safety equipment in performance cars. This includes roll cages, bars and guards. They are place through extensive tests both in the laboratory and on the track, to provide the best body and rigidity,

Super GT/JGTC 
From 1997 until 2008, Cusco Racing participated in the GT300 class of JGTC (renamed Super GT in 2005) with a Subaru Impreza WRX STI. Cusco Racing made their JGTC debut at the 1997 season finale at Sugo.

in the GT300 class, the team achieved three pole positions and two race wins, one of which in 2008 saw the Subaru Impreza become the first AWD vehicle to take victory in the championships history.

Complete Super GT results 
(key) (Races in bold indicate pole position) (Races in italics indicate fastest lap)

References 

Auto parts suppliers of Japan
Automotive companies established in 1977
Companies based in Gunma Prefecture
Japanese brands
1977 establishments in Japan